Pablo Peralta  (born ) is an Argentine male volleyball player. His position is Middle Blocker. He was part of the Argentina men's national volleyball team. He competed with the national team at the 2004 Summer Olympics in Athens, Greece. He played with Tenerife in 2004.

Clubs
  Rojas Scholem (2001/2002)
   Tenerife (2004)
  Club Ciudad de Bolívar (2006/2007)
  UPCN Vóley Club (2007/2008)
  Isernia Volley (2008/2009)
   Puerto San Martin Voley (2013/2014)
  Club Rosario (2017-Current)

See also
 Argentina at the 2004 Summer Olympics

References

1979 births
Living people
Argentine men's volleyball players
Place of birth missing (living people)
Volleyball players at the 2004 Summer Olympics
Olympic volleyball players of Argentina